Frank Sinatra Conducts Tone Poems of Color is a 1956 album of short tone poems by eight notable mid-20th century Hollywood composers.

The album was conducted by Sinatra and marked the first musical collaboration between Sinatra and Gordon Jenkins.  Each composition was inspired by the poetry of Norman Sickel.

A chapter discussing the album, "The Colors of Ava: Tone Poems of Color and the Painful Measure of Sinatra's Passions," appears in A Storied Singer: Frank Sinatra as Literary Conceit (Greenwood Press, 2002) by Gilbert L. Gigliotti.

The album was the first to be recorded at the then-newly opened Capitol Studios, which are under the Capitol Records Tower.

Track listing
"White" (Victor Young) – 4:14
"Green" (Gordon Jenkins) – 4:05
"Purple" (Billy May) – 4:21
"Yellow" (Jeff Alexander) – 2:38
"Gray" (Alec Wilder) – 4:29
"Gold" (Nelson Riddle) – 3:36
"Orange" (Nelson Riddle) – 4:57
"Black" (Victor Young) – 3:58
"Silver" (Elmer Bernstein) – 4:38
"Blue" (Alec Wilder) – 4:38
"Brown" (Jeff Alexander) – 4:01
"Red" (André Previn) – 3:57

Recording dates
 Tracks 1, 7, 8 & 11 were recorded February 22, 1956.
 Tracks 9 & 12 were recorded February 28, 1956.
 Tracks 2, 4, 5 & 10 were recorded March 7, 1956.
 Tracks 3 & 6 were recorded March 15, 1956.
 All Tracks recorded & engineered by John Palladino.

Personnel
 Frank Sinatra - Conductor

References

Albums conducted by Frank Sinatra
Capitol Records albums
1956 albums
Albums produced by Voyle Gilmore
Instrumental albums
Albums recorded at Capitol Studios